Mikkel Kaufmann Sørensen (born 3 January 2001) is a Danish professional footballer who plays as a forward for 2. Bundesliga club Karlsruher SC, on loan from Copenhagen.

Career

AaB
A youth prospect of AaB, Kaufmann made his official debut for the club on 6 August 2018 in a game against Vendsyssel FF, coming on the pitch from the bench with three minutes left. On 7 April 2019, Kaufmann scored his first professional goal against Hobro IK in stoppage time, as the game ended 1–1.

Copenhagen
On 24 January 2020, Danish Superliga champions FC Copenhagen announced, that they had signed AaB topscorer Kaufmann from the summer 2020. However, after Carlo Holse was sold from Copenhagen, the club decided to bring him in immediately on the last day of the winter transfer market. The fee was rumored to be about DKK 20 million plus an additional 1.5 million to sign him immediately. Kaufmann's transfer became the third biggest deal in the history of AaB.

On 9 July 2021, Kaufmann joined Hamburger SV on a season-long loan deal. After a disappointing season in Hamburger with two goals 32 games, Kaufmann was loaned out again: fellow league club, Karlsruher SC, confirmed on 22 June 2022, that Kaufmann had been loaned out to the club for one year.

References

External links
 

2001 births
Living people
People from Hjørring
Danish men's footballers
Danish expatriate men's footballers
Association football forwards
Denmark youth international footballers
Denmark under-21 international footballers
Vendsyssel FF players
AaB Fodbold players
F.C. Copenhagen players
Hamburger SV players
Karlsruher SC players
Danish Superliga players
2. Bundesliga players
Danish expatriate sportspeople in Germany
Expatriate footballers in Germany
Sportspeople from the North Jutland Region